The University Libraries function as the academic library system for Bowling Green State University, and its regional campuses.

History

Establishment
The first library of the Bowling Green Normal College was established in 1914 in the basement of a nearby Methodist Church, with its first professional librarian hired in 1915. Also in 1915, the library was moved from its temporary location off campus to the third floor of University Hall.

McFall Center
In 1927 the library moved into its first dedicated building, The McFall center. In the 1950s the old library was expanded, and by 1961 it contained 330,000 items.

Jerome Library
Construction of a new library began in 1965. In 1982, the building was named in honor of William Travers Jerome III, who served as the sixth president of Bowling Green State University. In 2017 Jerome Library served about 450,000 people annually and held over 2 million items.

Jerome Library
The building, which was designed by state architect Carl E. Bentz, features unique non-objective murals on the east and west facades of the library designed by Don Drumm. Drumm, an artist in residence during the 1960s, actively participated in the conceptualization and construction of the murals. Drumm outlined contemporary designs onto the concrete. Construction crews then sandblasted the designs into the concrete. Drumm added shadow pins to the west mural to capture light and create shadows to complete the mural. The nine-level, 156,895 sq ft structure, is located between Memorial and East Halls.

The William T. Jerome Library is open to the community. The library is a member of OhioLINK, a statewide library and information system that enables BGSU students, faculty and staff to borrow books from other Ohio libraries and to access to many online research databases.

Learning Commons
The Learning Commons opened in fall 2011, consolidating the Study Skills Center, Writing Center, and Mathematics and Statistics Tutoring Center. It offers 13,565 square feet of study space, computers, and a tutorial center.

Specialized collections and branches

Government Documents (1st floor)
Bowling Green State University, which serves Ohio's 5th Congressional district, became a federal depository in 1933. Librarians select 57% of the offered items, receiving approximately 400 documents each month. This collection of 700,000 publications is rich in historical and current material including the following materials:

 Census of Population reports from 1790 to present
 Foreign Relations of the United States
 U.S. Treaties and International Agreements
 U.S. Congressional Serial Set

The collection emphasizes materials in business, civil rights, economics, education, environment, foreign relations, health, housing, justice, labor, presidential materials, small business, and social welfare. Additionally librarians select all congressional materials including hearings, reports, documents, floor debates, bills and public laws, and studies.

The department became an Ohio depository in 1953 and receives all agency publications distributed through the state depository program. The collection includes agency publications such as reports, directories, pamphlets, leaflets, posters, newsletters, and journals; Judicial Branch materials including administrative opinions and the Supreme Court of Ohio opinions and decisions; and Ohio General Assembly materials, including the Laws of Ohio and the House and Senate Journals.

In the early 1980s selected material from the city of Bowling Green was added to the collection including City Council Minutes, Mayor's Reports, the Bowling Green City Code of Ordinances, and the Annual Report of the Bowling Green Police Division.

BGSU became a Canadian Government Documents Depository in October, 1999. This collection focuses on business, environment, Great Lakes, Native Peoples, and social issues. It includes journals, reports, and cd-roms. The library also collects some of the important statistical reports produced by Statistics Canada.

Curriculum Resource Center
The Curriculum Resource Center (CRC) supports the undergraduate and graduate teaching programs in the College of Education and Human Development and other BGSU education-related areas by maintaining a collection of high quality preschool through grade twelve materials reflecting innovation in teaching practices and standards-based instruction. Materials held by the CRC comprise the Frances F. Povsic Collection, so named on March 30, 2001, in honor of Professor Povsic's significant, enduring and distinctive contributions to the CRC, the University Libraries, and BGSU. The CRC is also home to the Children's Book Center

Music Library and Bill Schurk Sound Archives 

The Music Library and Bill Schurk Sound Archives, located on the third floor of Jerome Library, contains materials related to the study of music. Although the collection primarily supports the undergraduate and graduate programs in the College of Musical Arts, the Department of Popular Culture, and the Center for American Culture Studies, the resources of the library are available to all interested users.

The Music Library contains more than 60,000 books and scores related to all aspects of the study of music. Studies ranging from biography to general histories of music, from theoretical treatises to studies of such diverse aspects as country music, opera, and band music are included in the collection. The score collection includes solos, orchestral studies, exercise books, and chamber music for ensembles from two to ten parts. The recordings collection, which circulates on a limited basis, contains more than 16,000 recordings of music from all periods of music history as well as ethnic music, musical theatre, and jazz. Recital tapes from the College of Musical Arts dating from 1966 are maintained by the Music Library. All masters' theses and documents written by graduate students in the College of Musical Arts are housed in the collection.

The Music Library houses two special collections: The Bill Schurk Sound Archives and the Archives of the MidAmerican Center for Contemporary Music. The Bill Schurk Sound Archives, considered the nation's premier collection of popular music sound recordings, contains more than 700,000 recordings representing all styles of popular music and all recorded formats. Established in 1967 for the scholarly study of popular music, the Bill Schurk Sound Archives serves not only campus patrons, but also researchers from around the world. Discographies, books, and periodicals related to popular music and the recording industry are also included in this collection. Established in 1987, the Archives of the MidAmerican Center for Contemporary Music contains music both submitted to and performed at the College of Musical Arts' New Music and Art Festival. At present, the collection contains more than 3800 scores of contemporary music, many in manuscript.

Browne Popular Culture Library

The Browne Popular Culture Library (BPCL), founded in 1969 and dedicated to the acquisition and preservation of research materials on American popular culture (post 1876), is the most comprehensive repository of its kind in the United States.

The Browne Popular Culture Library holds more than 190,000 cataloged books. Popular fiction predominates, particularly novels in the romance, mystery-detective, science fiction-fantasy, and western genres. This Library also contains extensive collections of late 19th- and 20th-century juvenile/young adult series fiction.

Other major strengths of the Browne Popular Culture Library includes materials documenting popular entertainment and the entertainment industry (e.g., television, film, radio, and the mass communications industry), graphic arts, recreation and leisure, and popular religion. Non-fiction holdings also include books on the occult and supernatural, parapsychology, manner and customs, etiquette and advice, arts and crafts, hobbies, games and amusements, sports, foodways and cookery, domestic arts, costume and dress, and humor. Users can also find popular reference and informational materials (self-help and how-to books, for example) in the library's collections.

In addition to many rare hardcover and paperback books and magazines, the Browne Popular Culture Library houses archival and special collections, including literary manuscripts and movie and television scripts. Non-traditional library resources such as dime novels, storypapers and nickel weeklies, pulp magazines, fanzines and other amateur publications, comic books and graphic novels, and posters, postcards, greeting cards, mail-order catalogs, and travel brochures, comprise some of the library's most unusual collections. There are approximately 85,000 comic books in the collection. The Browne Popular Culture Library also collects manuscripts to support and complement existing print collections.

BPCL includes the Marie Wakefield Star Trek Collection. The Star Trek Collection includes Star Trek memorabilia given to the Popular Culture Library principally by Marie Wakefield, but also contains items received from Sandra Springer, and items from other miscellaneous sources. The collection contains a wide range of materials including, but not limited to, books, journals, clothing items, models, posters, games, puzzles, greeting cards, playing and trading cards, and calendars.

Center for Archival Collections
The Center for Archival Collections is an archives and manuscripts repository within the University Libraries at Bowling Green State University. The primary mission of the CAC is to actively acquire, preserve, and make accessible to researchers historical materials in Northwest Ohio, and houses the BGSU University Archives, the Historical Collections of the Great Lakes, a rare books collection, special collections, and the National Student Affairs Archives.

The collection emphasizes local history, Great Lakes maritime history, women's history, the Civil War, education, and all aspects of the social, cultural, economic, and industrial history of northwest Ohio.

Historical Collections of the Great Lakes
The Historical Collections of the Great Lakes (HCGL) is part of the Center for Archival Collections at Bowling Green State University. Its purpose is to collect, preserve, and make available to scholars, students, and the public, historical materials documenting the Great Lakes region and connecting waterways. The HCGL's collections include materials related to commercial shipping, shipbuilding, navigation, maritime law, commercial fishing, shipwrecks, yachting, labor history, popular literature, freshwater ecology, maritime culture, and the history of Great Lakes ports. The types of materials include manuscripts, newspaper clippings, photographs, maps, vessel data sheets, maritime architectural drawings, and published materials. In 2017 this collection received a large donation of materials from the National Museum of the Great Lakes.

Northwest Ohio Regional Book Depository

The Northwest Ohio Regional Book Depository is a storage facility in Perrysburg, Ohio containing BGSU and University of Toledo library materials. The building can hold up to 1.8 million items.

References

External links
Floors of Jerome Library

Libraries
Libraries in Ohio
Bowling Green State University
Buildings and structures in Wood County, Ohio
Library buildings completed in 1967